Limevale is a rural locality in the Goondiwindi Region, Queensland, Australia.

Geography 

There are a number of mountains in the locality:
 Black Mountain
 Browns Mountain
 Pine Mountain

Texas State Forest 2 is in the north-west of the locality.

Road infrastructure
The Inglewood – Texas Road runs through from north to south.

History 
Limevale Provisional School opened on 31 January 1906. On 1 January 1909 it became Limevale State School. It closed on 2 June 1963.

Magee's Creek Provisional School opened on 7 July 1913. In 1918 closed temporarily as it had no teacher. It closed permanently in December 1925.

St Paul's Anglican Church opened circa 1962. It closed circa 1990.

Education 
There are no schools in Limevale. The nearest school is in Texas to the south which offers Prep to Year 10 schooling.

References 

 

Goondiwindi Region
Localities in Queensland